Liberian foreign relations were traditionally stable and cordial throughout much of the 19th and 20th centuries. During the 1990s, Charles Taylor's presidency and the First and Second Liberian Civil Wars underscored Liberian relations with the Western world, the People's Republic of China, and its neighboring countries in Western Africa.

Stabilization in the 21st century brought a return to cordial relations with neighboring countries and much of the Western world. Liberia holds diplomatic relations with many western nations, including its long time partner the United States, as well as Russia, Cuba, and the People's Republic of China.

Bilateral relations

Diplomatic Agreements
Liberia is a founding member of the United Nations (see Permanent Representative of Liberia to the United Nations) and its specialized agencies and is a member of the African Union (AU), Economic Community of West African States (ECOWAS), African Development Bank (ADB), Mano River Union (MRU) and the Non-Aligned Movement. Liberia is also a member of the International Criminal Court with a Bilateral Immunity Agreement of protection for the US-military (as covered under Article 98).

See also
List of diplomatic missions in Liberia
List of diplomatic missions of Liberia

References